Germany competed at the 1912 Summer Olympics in Stockholm, Sweden. 185 competitors, 180 men and 5 women, took part in 69 events in 14 sports. Due to the political fallout from World War I, this was that country's last appearance until 1928.

Medalists

Gold

 Paul Günther — Diving, Men's 3m Springboard
 Albert Arnheiter, Hermann Wilker, Otto Fickeisen, Rudolf Fickeisen and Karl Leister — Rowing, Men's coxed fours
 Walter Bathe — Swimming, Men's 200m breaststroke
 Walter Bathe — Swimming, Men's 400m breaststroke
 Dorothea Köring and Heinrich Schomburgk — Tennis, Mixed doubles outdoor

Silver

 Hanns Braun — Athletics, Men's 400m
 Hans Liesche — Athletics, Men's high jump
 Albert Zürner — Diving, Men's 10m Platform
 Hans Luber — Diving, Men's 3m Springboard
 Friedrich von Rochow — Equestrian, Individual eventing
 Friedrich von Rochow, Richard Graf von Schaesberg-Tannheim, Eduard von Lütcken and Carl von Moers — Equestrian, Team eventing
 Rabod von Kröcher — Equestrian, Individual jumping
 Alfred Goeldel — Shooting, Men's Trap
 Otto Fahr — Swimming, Men's 100m backstroke
 Wilhelm Lützow — Swimming, Men's 200m breaststroke
 Wally Dressel, Louise Otto, Hermine Stindt and Grete Rosenberg — Swimming, Women's 4 × 100 m freestyle relay
 Dorothea Köring — Tennis, Women's singles outdoor
 Georg Gerstäcker — Wrestling, Greco-Roman featherweight

Bronze

 Kurt Behrens — Diving, Men's 3m Springboard
 Sigismund Freyer, Wilhelm Graf von Hohenau, Ernst Deloch and Prince Friedrich Karl of Prussia — Equestrian, Team jumping
 Otto Liebing, Max Bröske, Fritz Bartholomae, Willi Bartholomae, Werner Dehn, Rudolf Reichelt, Hans Matthiae, Kurt Runge and Max Vetter — Rowing, Men's eights
 Erich Graf von Bernstorff, Franz von Zedlitz und Leipe, Horst Goeldel, Albert Preuß, Erland Koch and Alfred Goeldel — Shooting, Men's Team clay pigeons
 Paul Kellner — Swimming, Men's 100m backstroke
 Paul Malisch — Swimming, Men's 200m breaststroke
 Oscar Kreuzer — Tennis, Men's singles outdoor

Aquatics

Swimming

17 swimmers, including four women, competed for Germany at the 1912 Games. It was the fourth time the nation had competed in swimming, having missed only the 1896 swimming events.

The German men took six medals, four in breaststroke events and two in backstroke. The breaststroke trio swept the 200 meter breaststroke medals, and Bathe added a second gold medal in the 400 meter event. The four women took silver in the inaugural women's relay event. None of the women won an individual medal, with Rosenberg finishing 0.2 seconds behind the bronze medalist in the final to take fourth place.

Ranks given for each swimmer are within the heat.

 Men

 Women

Athletics

24 athletes represented Germany. It was the fifth appearance of the nation in athletics, which Germany had appeared each time the Olympics had been held. The nation finished with two medals, both silver. Hanns Braun finished with the silver in the 400 metres and Hans Liesche won the silver medal in the high jump; these silvers were Germany's best results in the 1912 athletics competition and tied Germany's best results in athletics in Olympic history to that point.

The 4x100 metre relay team tied for the best time in the preliminary heats, matching the Olympic record set earlier in that round by the Swedish team. It then had the fastest time in the semifinals, taking sole possession of the Olympic record. This new record stood even after the finals as none of the finalist teams ran a better time; Germany committed a fault passing the baton and was disqualified in the final.

Ranks given are within that athlete's heat for running events.

Cycling

Eleven cyclists represented Germany. It was the fourth appearance of the nation in cycling, which had only not competed in cycling in 1904. Franz Lemnitz had the best time in the time trial, the only race held, placing 26th. The top four German cyclists had a combined time that placed them 6th of the 15 teams.

Road cycling

Diving

Four divers, all men, represented Germany. It was Germany's third appearance in diving, with two of the top divers who had represented the nation in 1908 returning. The German men dominated the 3 metre springboard event with its second straight medal sweep in the event, taking the top four places in 1912. The team was less successful in the other two events, with only one of the four men advancing to the final in each. Zürner, the defending champion who finished fourth in the springboard, got a silver medal in the 10 metre platform event; this gave each of the four Germans a medal.

Rankings given are within the diver's heat.

 Men

Equestrian

 Dressage

 Eventing
(The maximum score in each of the five events was 10.00 points. Ranks given are for the cumulative score after each event. Team score is the sum of the top three individual scores.)

 Jumping
(Team score is the sum of the top three individual scores.)

Fencing

Fifteen fencers represented Germany. It was the fourth appearance of the nation in fencing, in which Germany had not competed only in 1896. None of the Germans were able to advance to the finals of any event.

Football

Round of 16

Consolation quarterfinals

Consolation semifinals

Final rank 7th place

Gymnastics

Leipzig University had organised a trip to the Olympics for some of its sports students so that they could undertake academic studies of the various sports disciplines. The organising body for German gymnasts, failed to organise the participation of an Olympic team. Leipzig University then applied for and was granted permission to provide a team of its students, led by the academic gymnastics teacher .

Eighteen gymnasts represented Germany. It was the fifth appearance of the nation in gymnastics, in which Germany had competed at every Olympic Games. The nation sent no individual gymnasts, but did have a team compete in two of the three team events. In neither event did the team win a medal.

Artistic

Roster
Wilhelm Brülle, Johannes Buder, Walter Engelmann, Arno Glockauer, Walter Jesinghaus, Karl Jordan, Rudolf Körner, Heinrich Pahner, Kurt Reichenbach, Johannes Reuschle, Carl Richter, Hans Roth, Adolf Seebaß, Eberhard Sorge, Alexander Sperling, Alfred Staats, Hans Werner, Martin Worm

Modern pentathlon 

Germany had one competitor in the first Olympic pentathlon competition. Pauen finished 28th of 32 competitors in the first phase, and did not start the second.

(The scoring system was point-for-place in each of the five events, with the smallest point total winning.)

Rowing 

Twenty six rowers represented Germany. It was the nation's third appearance in rowing. Germany's coxed fours boat won the gold medal. The two German eights boats met in the quarterfinals, with the winner of that race going on to win a bronze medal.

(Ranks given are within each crew's heat.)

Shooting 

Eleven shooters represented Germany. It was the nation's third appearance in shooting. Germany won its first Olympic shooting medals with a silver in the individual trap (by Alfred Goeldel) and a bronze in the team clay pigeons.

Tennis 

Seven tennis players, including one woman, represented Germany at the 1912 Games. It was the nation's fourth appearance in tennis, having missed only 1900. The lone German woman, Köring, was the most successful German player, taking the silver medal in her outdoor singles competition and winning the gold along with Schomburgk in the outdoor mixed doubles. Kreuzer was the only one of the six men to advance to the semifinals in the men's singles; he finished with the bronze medal.

 Men

 Women

 Mixed

Wrestling

Greco-Roman

Germany sent 14 wrestlers in its third Olympic wrestling appearance. Gerstäcker had the best performance from among the Germans, taking the nation's first medal since 1896 when he placed second in the featherweight class. Two other Germans advanced to within one bout of the medal rounds. The German team went a combined 23-27 in the elimination rounds and 1-1 in the medals rounds.

Art Competitions

Footnotes

References

External links
Official Olympic Reports
International Olympic Committee results database

Nations at the 1912 Summer Olympics
1912
Olympics